Bibhuti Mishra  (1900 – 4 April 1981) was an Indian politician. He was elected to the Lok Sabha, lower house of the Parliament of India from Motihari, Bihar in 1952,1957,1962,1967 and 1971 as a member of the Indian National Congress. He was defeated in the 1977 elections and Thakur Ramapati Singh was elected.

References

1900 births
1981 deaths
India MPs 1952–1957
India MPs 1957–1962
India MPs 1962–1967
India MPs 1967–1970
India MPs 1971–1977
Indian National Congress politicians
Lok Sabha members from Bihar